Arcelor S.A. was the world's largest steel producer in terms of turnover and the second largest in terms of steel output, with a turnover of €30.2 billion and shipments of 45 million metric tons of steel in 2004. The company was created in 2002 by a merger of the former companies Aceralia (Spain), Usinor (France) and Arbed (Luxembourg).

Arcelor is now part of ArcelorMittal after a takeover by Mittal Steel in 2006.

Business
Once employing 310,000 employees in over 60 countries, it was a major player in all its main markets: automotive, construction, metal processing, primary transformation, household appliances, and packaging, as well as general industry. With total sales of over €40 billion, Arcelor was, by 2006, one of the world's largest steel manufacturer in terms of turnover.

It produced long steel products, flat steel products and inox-steel.

In January 2006 Arcelor announced the acquisition of Dofasco, Canada's largest steel producer with an annual output of 4.4 million tons. After an intense bidding war against the German ThyssenKrupp, Arcelor had finally bid 5.6 billion Canadian dollars.

Merger with Mittal Steel
The company was the target of a hostile takeover bid by its rival Mittal Steel on 27 January 2006. However, the bid resulted in substantial increase in Arcelor's share value. Two members of the board of Arcelor, Guillermo Ulacia and Jacques Chabanier also resigned suddenly. On 26 May 2006 Arcelor announced its intention to merge with Severstal. Since then several economists, media and shareholders have questioned the intentions of Arcelor in announcing its merger with Severstal due to a perceived opacity in the transaction. But on 25 June 2006, the Arcelor board decided to go ahead with the merger with Mittal Steel and scrapped plans for Severstal merger. The new company is now called "ArcelorMittal". Arcelor also paid Severstal €140 million as a "fine" for the fall-out of their failed talks. Lakshmi Mittal (owner of Mittal Steel) became the president and Joseph Kinsch (formerly Arcelor chairman) was appointed chairman of the new company till his retirement. Arcelor's merger with Mittal created the worldwide leader in the steel industry, increasing its bargaining power with suppliers and consumers. Mittal Steel agreed to pay 40.37 euros a share to Arcelor, almost double the amount offered  six months previous.

Reaction to the takeover
Arcelor's directors strongly opposed the takeover, as did the governments of France, Luxembourg and Spain. The Belgian government, on the other hand, declared its stance as neutral and invited both parties to deliver a business plan with the future investments in research in the Belgian steel plants. The French opposition was initially very fierce and has been criticized in the Indian media as double standards and economic nationalism in Europe. Indian commerce minister Kamal Nath warned that any attempt by France to block the deal would lead to a trade war between India and France.

On June 20, the above claim by economists was confirmed when Severstal increased its valuation of Arcelor. Management of Arcelor had in fact undervalued the company itself. The capability of management which had openly supported the previous valuation of Arcelor came into question. Further the combined markets of France, Belgium, Luxembourg and Spain chided Arcelor management and suspended trading of its stock.

On June 26, the Board of Directors recommended the approval of the improved Mittal offer (49% improvement compared to the initial offer with 108% improvement of the cash component), proposed the creation of Arcelor-Mittal with industrial and corporate governance model based on Arcelor and scheduled a corporate meeting for June 30 to vote on this.

Products
The products of Arcelor are divided into three groups: Flat steel products, long steel products and stainless steel.

Flat steel products
The main production sites of flat steel products are Ghent, Dunkirk, Avilés, Gijón, Fos-sur-Mer, Piombino, Liège, Florange, Bremen, Eisenhüttenstadt and recently São Francisco do Sul in Brazil.

See also

 ArcelorMittal
 List of steel producers
 Mittal Steel Company

References

External links

Arcelormittal.com: ArcelorMittal corporate website
Arcelormittal.com: Constructalia
Biz.Yahoo.com: "Arcelor SA Company Profile" (2004)— archived version.
Nerve.in: Timeline of events for Arcelor-Mittal deal
BBC News: "Mittal Steel unveils Arcelor bid" 
Agarwal Today: "Special Report, Lakshmi Mittal buys Arcelor" (2006)— archived version.

.
Steel companies of Luxembourg
Defunct companies of Luxembourg
Companies based in Luxembourg City
Manufacturing companies established in 2002
Manufacturing companies disestablished in 2006
2006 disestablishments in Luxembourg
Luxembourgian companies established in 2002